François Bouvier is a Canadian film and television director from Quebec.

His credits have included the films Jacques and November (Jacques et novembre), Unfaithful Mornings (Les Matins infidèles), Les Pots cassés, Winter Stories (Histoires d'hiver), Maman Last Call, Paul à Québec and La Bolduc, and episodes of Urgence, Quai #1, Tribu.com, Miss Météo, Les Hauts et les bas de Sophie Paquin, 30 vies and Jérémie.

He was a Genie Award nominee for Best Director at the 11th Genie Awards in 1990 for Les Matins infidèles, and for Best Adapted Screenplay at the 20th Genie Awards in 1999 for Histoires d'hiver.

References

External links

Film directors from Quebec
Canadian television directors
Canadian screenwriters in French
Film producers from Quebec
Writers from Quebec
Living people
Year of birth missing (living people)